Michael Pierce (born November 6, 1992) is an American football nose tackle for the Baltimore Ravens of the National Football League (NFL). He played college football at Tulane University before transferring to Samford University and was signed by the Ravens as an undrafted free agent in 2016.

Professional career
Pierce was not invited to the NFL combine. At his Pro Day, he ran 10 meter split faster than any DL at the combine (1.67 vs Alex McCalister's 1.68) and performed a broad jump inside the Top 15 for DL.

Baltimore Ravens
On May 3, 2016, Pierce signed with the Baltimore Ravens as an undrafted free agent. As a rookie in the 2016 season, Pierce appeared in all 16 games and finished the season with 35 tackles, two sacks, and one pass defended. On September 10, in the 2017 season opener against the Cincinnati Bengals, Pierce recovered a Terrell Suggs-forced fumble, which came off of quarterback Andy Dalton, in the 20–0 victory. On March 9, 2019, the Ravens placed a second-round restricted free agent tender on Pierce. On May 1, 2019, the Ravens re-signed Pierce.

Minnesota Vikings
On March 25, 2020, Pierce signed a three-year, $27 million contract with the Minnesota Vikings. On July 28, 2020, Pierce announced he would opt out of the 2020 season due to the COVID-19 pandemic, and was placed on the reserve/opt-out list by the Vikings.

Pierce returned in 2021 as a starting defensive tackle. He started the first four games before suffering an elbow injury in Week 4. He missed the next four games before being placed on injured reserve on November 13, 2021. He was activated on December 4, 2021.

Pierce was released on March 15, 2022.

Baltimore Ravens (second stint)
On March 17, 2022, Pierce signed a three-year, $16.5 million contract with the Baltimore Ravens. He suffered a torn biceps in Week 3 and was placed on season-ending injured reserve on September 29, 2022.

NFL career statistics

References

External links
 Samford Bulldogs bio
 Baltimore Ravens bio

1992 births
Living people
Players of American football from Alabama
People from Daphne, Alabama
American football defensive tackles
Tulane Green Wave football players
Samford Bulldogs football players
Baltimore Ravens players
Minnesota Vikings players